Japan competed at the 1988 Summer Olympics in Seoul, South Korea. 255 competitors, 186 men and 69 women, took part in 166 events in 23 sports.

Medalists

| width=78% align=left valign=top |

| width=22% align=left valign=top |

Competitors
The following is the list of number of competitors in the Games.

Archery

In their fourth Olympic archery competition, Japan was unable to win any medals.  Defending bronze medallist Hiroshi Yamamoto placed eighth, the only individual archer to make the finals.  The men's team placed sixth overall, while the women's team was last place.

Women's Individual Competition:
 Toyoka Oki — Preliminary round (→ 31st place)
 Keiko Nakagomi — Preliminary round (→ 52nd place)
 Kyoko Kitahara — Preliminary round (→ 53rd place)

Men's Individual Competition:
 Hiroshi Yamamoto — Final (→ 8th place)
 Takayoshi Matsushita — Quarterfinal (→ 14th place)
 Terushi Furuhashi — Preliminary round (→ 40th place)

Women's Team Competition:
 Oki, Nakagomi, and Kitahara — Preliminary round (→ 15th place)

Men's Team Competition:
 Yamamoto, Matsushita, and Furuhashi — Final (→ 6th place)

Athletics

Men's 100 metres
Koji Kurihara
Takahiko Kasahara
Tomohiro Osawa

Men's 200 metres
Kenji Yamauchi

Men's 400 metres
Susumu Takano

Men's 5,000 metres
Shuichi Yoneshige

Men's 10,000 metres 
 Kozu Akutsu 
 Heat — 28:16.43
 Final — 28:09.70 (→ 14th place)

 Shuichi Yoneshige 
 Heat — 28:26.04 
 Final — 29:04.44 (→ 17th place)

 Tsukasa Endo
 Heat — did not finish (→ did not advance)

Men's Marathon 
 Takeyuki Nakayama 
 Final — 2:11:05 (→ 4th place)

 Toshihiko Seko 
 Final — 2:13:41 (→ 9th place)

 Hisatoshi Shintaku 
 Final — 2:15:42 (→ 17th place)

Men's 4 × 100 m Relay 
 Kaoru Matsubara, Shinji Aoto, Koji Kurihara, and Takahiro Kasahara
 Heat — 39.70
 Shinji Aoto, Kenji Yamauchi, Koji Kurihara, and Susumu Takano
 Semi Final — 38.90 (→ did not advance)

Men's 4 × 400 m Relay 
 Hirofumi Koike, Kenji Yamauchi, Hiromi Kawasumi, and Susumu Takano
 Heat — 3:05.63
 Semi Final — 3:03.80 (→ did not advance)

Men's Long Jump 
 Hiroyuki Shibata
 Qualification — 7.48m (→ did not advance)

 Junichi Usui
 Qualification — NM (→ did not advance)

Men's Triple Jump
 Norifumi Yamashita

Men's Javelin Throw 
 Kazuhiro Mizoguchi
 Qualification — 77.46m (→ did not advance)

 Masami Yoshida
 Qualification — 76.90m (→ did not advance)

Men's 20 km Walk
 Hirofumi Sakai
 Final — 1:24:08 (→ 26th place)

 Tadahiro Kosaka
 Final — 1:32:46 (→ 47th place)

Men's 50 km Walk
 Tadahiro Kosaka
 Final — 4'03:12 (→ 31st place)

Women's 10,000 metres
Akemi Matsuno

Women's Marathon 
 Eriko Asai 
 Final — 2:34:41 (→ 25th place)

 Kumi Araki 
 Final — 2:35:15 (→ 28th place)
 
 Misako Miyahara 
 Final — 2:35:26 (→ 29th place)

Women's High Jump
Megumi Sato

Women's Javelin Throw
 Emi Matsui
 Qualification — 56.26m (→ did not advance)

Boxing

Men's Light Flyweight (– 48 kg)
 Mamoru Kuroiwa 
 First Round — Lost to Ochiryn Demberel (MGL), KO-3

Canoeing

Cycling

Twelve cyclists, nine men and three women, represented Japan in 1988.

Men's road race
 Mitsuhiro Suzuki
 Kyoshi Miura
 Yoshihiro Tsumuraya

Men's sprint
 Hideki Miwa

Men's 1 km time trial
 Hiroshi Toyooka

Men's team pursuit
 Koichi Azuma
 Fumiharu Miyamoto
 Kazuaki Sasaki
 Kazuo Takikawa

Men's points race
 Yoshihiro Tsumuraya

Women's road race
 Terumi Ogura — 2:00:52 (→ 30th place)
 Natsue Seki — 2:14:32 (→ 50th place)

Women's sprint
 Seiko Hashimoto

Diving

Equestrianism

Fencing

Ten fencers, five men and five women, represented Japan in 1988.

Men's foil
 Koji Emura
 Kenichi Umezawa
 Yoshihiko Kanatsu

Men's team foil
 Matsuo Azuma, Harunobu Deno, Koji Emura, Yoshihiko Kanatsu, Kenichi Umezawa

Women's foil
 Tomoko Oka
 Akemi Morikawa
 Mieko Miyahara

Women's team foil
 Nona Kiritani, Keiko Mine, Mieko Miyahara, Akemi Morikawa, Tomoko Oka

Gymnastics

Handball

Men's team competition
 Preliminary round (group B)
 vs East Germany (18 — 25)
 vs Spain (19 — 25)
 vs Hungary (19 — 22)
 vs South Korea (24 — 33)
 vs Czechoslovakia (17 — 21)
Classification Match 
11th/12th place: vs United States 24 — 21 (→ 11th place)

Team roster
Hidetada Ito  
Hiroshi Yanai   
Izumi Fujii  
Kazuhiro Miyashita   
Kenji Tamamura  
Kiyoshi Nishiyama  
Kodo Yamamoto  
Koji Tachiki   
Seiichi Takamura 
Shinichi Shudo 
Shinji Okuda   
Takashi Taguchi   
Toshiyuki Yamamura 
Yoshihiro Nikawadori 
Yukihiro Hashimoto

Judo

Modern pentathlon

Three male pentathletes represented Japan in 1988.

Men's Individual Competition:
 Hiroshi Saito — 4881pts (→ 30th place)
 Tadafumi Miwa — 4517pts (→ 51st place)
 Hiroaki Izumikawa — 3722pts (→ 63rd place)

Men's Team Competition:
 Saito, Miwa, and Izumikawa — 13120pts (→ 17th place)

Rhythmic gymnastics

Rowing

Sailing

Shooting

Swimming

Men's 100 m Freestyle
 Shigeo Ogata
 Heat — 52.08 (→ did not advance, 32nd place)

Men's 200 m Freestyle
 Shigeo Ogata
 Heat — 1:51.14
 B-Final — 1:51.89 (→ 15th place)

Men's 400 m Freestyle
 Yoshiyuki Mizumoto
 Heat — 4:02.02 (→ did not advance, 32nd place)

 Shigeo Ogata
 Heat — 4:05.68 (→ did not advance, 38th place)

Men's 1500 m Freestyle
 Masashi Kato
 Heat — 15:47.35 (→ did not advance, 25th place)

 Yoshiyuki Mizumoto
 Heat — 15:52.06 (→ did not advance, 27th place)

Men's 100 m Backstroke
 Daichi Suzuki
 Heat — 55.90
 Final — 55.05 (→  Gold Medal)

 Shigemori Maruyama
 Heat — 57.54
 B-Final — 57.13 (→ 12th place)

Men's 200 m Backstroke
 Daichi Suzuki
 Heat — 2:03.36
 B-Final — 2:04.67 (→ 15th place)

 Shigemori Maruyama
 Heat — 2:09.16 (→ did not advance, 32nd place)

Men's 100 m Breaststroke
 Hironobu Nagahata
 Heat — 1:04.02
 B-Final — 1:03.89 (→ 13th place)

 Kenji Watanabe
 Heat — 1:04.35 (→ did not advance, 18th place)

Men's 200 m Breaststroke
 Shigehiro Takahashi
 Heat — 2:17.69
 B-Final — 2:18.03 (→ 10th place)

 Hironobu Nagahata
 Heat — 2:22.23 (→ did not advance, 30th place)

Men's 100 m Butterfly
 Hiroshi Miura
 Heat — 54.82
 B-Final — 54.98 (→ 14th place)

 Yukinori Tanaka
 Heat — 56.19 (→ did not advance, 24th place)

Men's 200 m Butterfly
 Satoshi Takeda
 Heat — 2:01.42
 B-Final — 2:02.18 (→ 15th place)

 Hiroshi Miura
 Heat — 2:02.30 (→ did not advance, 19th place)

Men's 200 m Individual Medley
 Takahiro Fujimoto
 Heat — 2:07.23 (→ did not advance, 19th place)

 Satoshi Takeda
 Heat — 2:08.11 (→ did not advance, 22nd place)

Men's 400 m Individual Medley
 Yoshiyuki Mizumoto
 Heat — 4:28.11 (→ did not advance, 17th place)

 Takahiro Fujimoto
 Heat — 4:33.03 (→ did not advance, 25th place)

Men's 4 × 100 m Medley Relay
 Daichi Suzuki, Hironobu Nagahata, Hiroshi Miura, and Shigeo Ogata
 Heat — 3:46.88
 Final — 3:44.36 (→ 5th place)

Women's 50 m Freestyle
 Ayako Nakano
 Heat — 26.44
 B-Final — 26.45 (→ 12th place)

 Kaori Sasaki
 Heat — 26.61 (→ did not advance, 20th place)

Women's 100 m Freestyle
 Ayako Nakano
 Heat — 57.29
 B-Final — 56.72 (→ 10th place)

 Kaori Sasaki
 Heat — 58.40 (→ did not advance, 32nd place)

Women's 200 m Freestyle
 Chikako Nakamori
 Heat — 2:01.76
 B-Final — 2:02.31 (→ 14th place)

 Kaori Sasaki
 Heat — 2:06.18 (→ did not advance, 29th place)

Women's 400 m Freestyle
 Chikako Nakamori
 Heat — 4:15.51
 B-Final — 4:15.59 (→ 15th place)

 Tomomi Hosoda
 Heat — 4:17.30 (→ did not advance, 19th place)

Women's 800 m Freestyle
 Tomomi Hosoda
 Heat — 8:39.55 (→ did not advance, 11th place)

Women's 100 m Backstroke
 Satoko Morishita
 Heat — 1:05.38 (→ did not advance, 24th place)

 Tomoko Onogi
 Heat — 1:06.14 (→ did not advance, 26th place)

Women's 200 m Backstroke
 Satoko Morishita
 Heat — 2:18.74
 B-Final — 2:18.78 (→ 14th place)

 Tomoko Onogi
 Heat — 2:21.46 (→ did not advance, 20th place)

Women's 100 m Breaststroke
 Yoshie Nishioka
 Heat — 1:13.36 (→ did not advance, 24th place)

 Hiroko Nagasaki
 Heat — 1:16.63 (→ did not advance, 26th place)

Women's 200 m Breaststroke
 Yoshie Nishioka
 Heat — 2:35.81 (→ did not advance, 19th place)

 Hiroko Nagasaki
 Heat — 2:37.44 (→ did not advance, 23rd place)

Women's 100 m Butterfly
 Kiyomi Takahashi
 Heat — 1:02.04
 B-Final — 1:01.80 (→ 10th place)

 Takayo Kitano
 Heat — 1:02.35
 B-Final — 1:02.53 (→ 14th place)

Women's 200 m Butterfly
 Kiyomi Takahashi
 Heat — 2:12.68
 Final — 2:11.62 (→ 6th place)

 Takayo Kitano
 Heat — 2:15.41
 B-Final — 2:15.61 (→ 14th place)

Women's 200 m Individual Medley
 Yoshie Nishioka
 Heat — 2:20.20
 B-Final — 2:20.43 (→ 16th place)

 Hiroyo Harada
 Heat — 2:22.59 (→ did not advance, 22nd place)

Women's 400 m Individual Medley
 Yoshie Nishioka
 Heat — 4:55.31 (→ did not advance, 19th place)

 Hiroyo Harada
 Heat — 5:00.92 (→ did not advance, 23rd place)

Women's 4 × 100 m Medley Relay
 Satoko Morishita, Yoshie Nishioka, Kiyomi Takahashi, and Ayako Nakano
 Heat — 4:18.88 (→ did not advance, 12th place)

Synchronized swimming

Three synchronized swimmers represented Japan in 1988.

Women's solo
 Mikako Kotani
 Megumi Itō
 Miyako Tanaka

Women's duet
 Mikako Kotani
 Miyako Tanaka

Table tennis

Tennis

Women's Singles Competition
Kumiko Okamoto
 First Round — Lost to Catarina Lindqvist (Sweden) 6-7, 5-7

Etsuko Inoue
 First Round — Lost to Il-Soon Kim (South Korea) 3-6, 6-3, 5-7

Volleyball

Men's team competition
Preliminary round (group B)
 Lost to United States (0-3)
 Lost to Argentina (1-3)
 Lost to France (1-3)
 Defeated Tunisia (3-0)
 Lost to the Netherlands (0-3)
Classification Matches
 9th/12th place: Defeated South Korea (3-2)
 9th/10th place: Lost to Italy (2-3) → Tenth place

Team roster
Akihiro Iwashima
Yasunori Kumada
Eizaburo Mitsuhashi
Masayoshi Manabe
Yuji Kasama
Kazutomo Yoneyama
Hiromichi Kageyama
Hideharu Hara
Kimio Sugimoto
Yuzuru Inoue
Masaki Kaito
Shunichi Kawai
Head coach: Kazuya Mitake

Women's Team Competition
 Preliminary round (group A)
 Defeated Soviet Union (3-2)
 Lost to East Germany (2-3)
 Defeated South Korea (3-1)
 Semi Finals
 Lost to Peru (2-3)
 Final
 Lost to PR China (0-3) → Fourth place

 Team roster
Yumi Maruyama
Kayoko Sugiyama
Reiko Takizawa
Miyako Yamashita
Akemi Sugiyama
Ichiko Sato
Norie Hiro
Kumi Nakada
Yukari Kawase
Motoko Obayashi
Yukiko Takahashi
Sachiko Fujita
Head coach: Noriyuki Muneuchi

Weightlifting

Wrestling

References

Nations at the 1988 Summer Olympics
1988
Summer Olympics